Milton Rubincam (26 March 1909 – 9 September 1997) was an American genealogist who served as a member of The American Society of Genealogists, as well as its president from 1961 to 1964. He was also a notable member of the National Genealogical Society, serving as president of the organization from 1945 to 1949 as well as 1953 to 1954.

Biography

Early life and education
Milton Rubincam was born on March 26, 1909, at 5330 Catherine Street in West Philadelphia, Pennsylvania, the only child of Milton and Minnie Rubincam. He was educated at the Harrity-Lee School and the Anna Howard Shaw Junior High School, and later going to the Wesley Avenue and Central Avenue Schools in Ocean City, New Jersey, but childhood illnesses hindered his progress. He went to high school at the Ocean City High School, graduating in June 1930. During his childhood, he would gain an interest in genealogy from his uncle, who told him stories about the Rubincam family. In September 1930, he would begin studying journalism at Temple University, but he left the university before graduating.

Career and Genealogical Research
In 1934, Milton Rubincam moved to Washington D.C. with Priscilla Teasdale, his future wife, and the next year he started working as a clerk-typist on a Works Progress Administration project, the start of his career as a federal employee. In 1938, he joined the National Genealogical Society, serving as corresponding secretary from 1938 to 1942, associate editor from 1941 to 1957, vice president from 1943 to 1944, councilor from 1944 to 1945, as president for two terms, 1945-48 and 1953-54, and as an editor from 1957 to 1962. In 1957, he was also elected as a fellow of the group. In 1941, Milton was chosen as a fellow for the American Society of Genealogists, serving as vice president of the organization from 1946 to 1949 and 1959 to 1961, secretary-treasurer from 1951 to 1952, and president from 1961 to 1964. In 1972, Rubincam retired from his position as chief of security for the foreign operations office at the Commerce Department to become a full-time genealogist. During his lifetime, he contributed approximately 150 genealogical articles to journals such as the National Genealogical Society Quarterly, The American Genealogist, The New England Historical and Genealogical Register, as well as many other periodicals.

Marriage and children
Milton Rubincam married Priscilla Teasdale in 1935, and they had three sons: John (1941-2015), Milton III (1944-2019), and David (born 1947).

Death and afterward
Milton Rubincam died in Washington D.C. on September 9th, 1997, at the age of 88. He was buried in Arlington Cemetery, Drexel Hill, Pennsylvania.

Works
Rubincam, Milton. Pitfalls in Genealogical Research. Turner Publishing Company, 1987.
Rubincam, Milton. Evidence, an Exemplary Study: A Craig Family Case History. United States, National Genealogical Society, 1981.
Rubincam, Milton. Genealogy: A Selected Bibliography. United States, Banner Press, 1983.
Rubincam, Milton. Miscellaneous Papers Relating to the History of the Rubincam-Revercomb Family. Washington D.C, 1959.

See also
Milton Rubincam: A Bibliographical Record, 1935-1960. United States, Pennsylvania Historical Junto, 1960.

Recognition
In 2003, Milton Rubincam was elected to the National Genealogy Hall of Fame.

See also

American Society of Genealogists
National Genealogical Society

References

	

1909 births
1997 deaths
American genealogists
Fellows of the American Society of Genealogists
20th-century American people